Muriel Rukeyser (December 15, 1913 – February 12, 1980) was an American poet, essayist, biographer, and political activist. She wrote poems about equality, feminism, social justice, and Judaism. Kenneth Rexroth said that she was the greatest poet of her "exact generation".

One of her most powerful pieces was a group of poems titled The Book of the Dead (1938), documenting the details of the Hawk's Nest incident, an industrial disaster in which hundreds of miners died of silicosis.

Her poem "To be a Jew in the Twentieth Century" (1944), on the theme of Judaism as a gift, was adopted by the American Reform and Reconstructionist movements for their prayer books, something Rukeyser said "astonished" her, as she had remained distant from Judaism throughout her early life.

Early life
Muriel Rukeyser was born on December 15, 1913 to Lawrence and Myra Lyons Rukeyser. She attended the Ethical Culture Fieldston School, a private school in The Bronx, then Vassar College in Poughkeepsie. From 1930 to 32, she attended Columbia University.

Her literary career began in 1935 when her book of poetry Theory of Flight, based on flying lessons she took, was chosen by the American poet Stephen Vincent Benét for publication in the Yale Younger Poets Series.

Activism and writing

Rukeyser was active in progressive politics throughout her life. At age 21, she covered the Scottsboro case in Alabama, then worked for the International Labor Defense, which handled the defendants' appeals. She wrote for the Daily Worker and a variety of publications, including Decision and Life & Letters Today, for which she covered the People's Olympiad (Olimpiada Popular, Barcelona), the Catalan government's alternative to the Nazis' 1936 Berlin Olympics. While she was in Spain, the Spanish Civil War broke out, the basis of her book Mediterranean. Rukeyser famously traveled to Gauley Bridge, West Virginia, to investigate the recurring silicosis among miners there, which resulted in her poem sequence The Book of the Dead. During and after World War II, she gave a number of striking public lectures, published in The Life of Poetry. For much of her life, she taught university classes and led workshops, but she never became a career academic.

In 1996, Paris Press reissued The Life of Poetry, which was published in 1949 but had fallen out of print. In a publisher's note, Jan Freeman called it a book that "ranks among the most essential works of twentieth century literature." In it Rukeyser makes the case that poetry is essential to democracy, essential to human life and understanding.

In the 1960s and 1970s, when Rukeyser presided over PEN America, her feminism and opposition to the Vietnam War drew a new generation to her poetry. The title poem of her final book, The Gates, is based on her unsuccessful attempt to visit Korean poet Kim Chi-Ha on death row in South Korea. In 1968, she signed the "Writers and Editors War Tax Protest" pledge, vowing to refuse tax payments in protest against the Vietnam War.

In addition to her poetry, she wrote a fictionalized memoir, The Orgy, plays and screenplays, and translated work by Octavio Paz and Gunnar Ekelöf. She also wrote biographies of Josiah Willard Gibbs, Wendell Willkie, and Thomas Hariot. Andrea Dworkin worked as her secretary in the early 1970s. Also in the 1970s she served on the Advisory Board of the Westbeth Playwrights Feminist Collective, a New York City based theatre group that wrote and produced plays on feminist issues.

Rukeyser died in New York on February 12, 1980, from a stroke, with diabetes as a contributing factor. She was 66.

In other media
In the television show Supernatural, Metatron the angel quotes an excerpt of Rukeyser's poem "Speed of Darkness": "The Universe is made of stories, not of atoms."

Jeanette Winterson's novel Gut Symmetries (1997) quotes Rukeyser's poem "King's Mountain".

Rukeyser's translation of a poem by Octavio Paz was adapted by Eric Whitacre for his choral composition "Water Night."  John Adams set one of her texts in his opera Doctor Atomic, and Libby Larsen set the poem "Looking at Each Other" in her choral work Love Songs.

Writer Marian Evans and composer Chris White are collaborating on a play about Rukeyser, Throat of These Hours, titled after a line in Rukeyser's Speed of Darkness.

The JDT: Journal of Narrative Theory, a publication from Eastern Michigan University, dedicated a special issue to Rukeyser in Fall 2013.

Rukeyser's 5-poem sequence "Käthe Kollwitz" (The Speed of Darkness, 1968, Random House) was set by Tom Myron in his composition "Käthe Kollwitz for Soprano and String Quartet," "written in response to a commission from violist Julia Adams for a work celebrating the 30th anniversary of the Portland String Quartet in 1998."

Rukeyser's poem "Gunday's Child" was set to music by the experimental rock band Sleepytime Gorilla Museum.

Personal life
Rukeyser was bisexual. In 1936 she had traveled to Spain to cover the People's Olympiad for the literary journal Life and Letters. The Spanish Civil War broke out and during her five-day stay, she fell in love with Otto Boch, a German communist athlete who volunteered to fight the fascists, and who was later killed. That experience was evoked in "To Be A Jew". 
Also, her literary agent Monica McCall was her partner for decades.

Awards
 Yale Younger Poets Award (1935) with Theory of Flight
 Harriet Monroe Poetry Award (the first)
 Levinson Prize
 Copernicus Prize
 Guggenheim Fellowship

Works

 Rukeyser's original collections of poetry
Theory of Flight. Foreword by Stephen Vincent Benet. New Haven: Yale Uni. Press, 1935.  Won the Yale Younger Poets Award in 1935. 
Mediterranean. Writers and Artists Committee, Medical Bureau to Aid Spanish Democracy, 1938. 
U.S. 1: Poems. Covici, Friede, 1938.
A Turning Wind: Poems. Viking, 1939.
 The Soul and Body of John Brown. Privately printed, 1940. With etchings by Rudolph von Ripper.
Wake Island. Doubleday, 1942.
Beast in View. Doubleday, 1944.
The Green Wave: Poems. Garden City, NY: Doubleday, 1948. Includes translations of Octavio Paz poems and rari. 
 Orpheus. Centaur Press, 1949. With the drawing "Orpheus" by Picasso. 
Elegies. New Directions, 1949.
Selected Poems. New Directions, 1951.
Body of Waking: Poems. NY: Harper, 1958. Includes translated poems of Octavio Paz.
Waterlily Fire: Poems 1935-1962. NY: Macmillan, 1962.
The Outer Banks. Santa Barbara CA: Unicorn, 1967. 2nd rev. ed., 1980.
The Speed of Darkness: Poems. NY: Random House, 1968.
29 Poems. Rapp & Whiting, 1972.
Breaking Open: New Poems. Random House, 1973.
The Gates: Poems. NY: McGraw-Hill, 1976.

 Fiction by Rukeyser
Savage Coast : A Novel. Feminist Press, 2013.

 Plays by Rukeyser
 The Middle of the Air. Produced in Iowa City, IA, 1945.
 The Colors of the Day: A Celebration of the Vassar Centennial. Produced in Poughkeepsie, NY, at Vassar College, June 10, 1961.
 Houdini. Produced in Lenox, MA, at Lenox Arts Center, July 3, 1973. Published as Houdini: A Musical, Paris Press, 2002.

 Children's books
Come Back, Paul. Harper, 1955.
 I Go Out. Harper, 1961. Illustrated by Leonard Kessler.
 Bubbles. Harcourt, Brace & World, 1967.
 Mazes. Simon & Schuster, 1970. Photography by Milton Charles.
More Night. Harper & Row, 1981. Illustrated by Symeon Shimin.

 Memoirs by Rukeyser

The Orgy: An Irish Journey of Passion and Transformation. London: Andre Deutsch, 1965; NY: Pocket Books, 1966; Ashfield, MA: Paris Press, 1997.

 Works of criticism by Rukeyser
The Life of Poetry. NY: Current Books, 1949; Morrow, 1974; Paris Press, 1996.

 Biographies by Rukeyser
Willard Gibbs: American Genius, 1942. Reprinted by the Ox Bow Press, Woodbridge CT.  Biography of Josiah Willard Gibbs, physicist.
One Life. NY: Simon and Schuster, 1957. Biography of Wendell Willkie.
The Traces of Thomas Hariot. NY: Random House, 1971. Biography of Thomas Hariot.

 Translations by Rukeyser
 Selected Poems of Octavio Paz. Indiana University Press, 1963. Rev. ed. published as Early Poems 1935-1955, New Directions, 1973.
 Sun Stone. Octavio Paz. New Directions, 1963.
 Selected Poems of Gunnar Ekelöf. With Leif Sjöberg. Twayne, 1967.
 Three Poems. Gunnar Ekelöf. T. Williams, 1967.
 Uncle Eddie's Moustache. Bertolt Brecht. 1974.
 A Molna Elegy: Metamorphoses. Gunnar Ekelöf. With Leif Sjöberg. 2 volumes. Unicorn Press, 1984.

 Edited collections of Rukeyser's works
 The Collected Poems of Muriel Rukeyser. McGraw, 1978.
 Out of Silence: Selected Poems. Edited by Kate Daniels. Triquarterly Books, 1992.
A Muriel Rukeyser Reader. Norton, 1994.
The Collected Poems of Muriel Rukeyser. University of Pittsburgh Press, 2005.

References

Further reading
 Barber, David S. "Finding Her Voice: Muriel Rukeyser's Poetic Development." Modern Poetry Studies 11, no. 1 (1982): 127–138
 Barber, David S. "'The Poet of Unity': Muriel Rukeyser's Willard Gibbs." CLIO: A Journal of Literature, History and the Philosophy of History 12 (Fall 1982): 1–15; "Craft Interview with Muriel Rukeyser." New York Quarterly 11 (Summer 1972) and in The Craft of Poetry, edited by William Packard (1974)
 Daniels, Kate, ed. Out of Silence: Selected Poems of Muriel Rukeyser (1992), and "Searching/Not Searching: Writing the Biography of Muriel Rukeyser." Poetry East 16/17 (Spring/Summer 1985): 70–93
 Gander, Catherine. Muriel Rukeyser and Documentary: The Poetics of Connection (EUP, 2013)
 Gardinier, Suzanne. "'A World That Will Hold All The People': On Muriel Rukeyser." Kenyon Review 14 (Summer 1992): 88–105
 Herzog, Anne E. & Kaufman, Janet E. (1999) "But Not in the Study: Writing as a Jew" in How Shall We Tell Each Other of the Poet?: The Life and Writing of Muriel Rukeyser.
 Jarrell, Randall. Poetry and the Age (1953)
 Kertesz, Louise. The Poetic Vision of Muriel Rukeyser (1980)
 Levi, Jan Heller, ed. A Muriel Rukeyser Reader (1994)
 Myles, Eileen, "Fear of Poetry." Review of The Life of Poetry, The Nation (April 14, 1997). This page includes several reviews, with much biographical information.
 Pacernick, Gary. "Muriel Rukeyser: Prophet of Social and Political Justice." Memory and Fire: Ten American Jewish Poets (1989)
 Rich, Adrienne. "Beginners." Kenyon Review 15 (Summer 1993): 12–19
 Rosenthal, M.L. "Muriel Rukeyser: The Longer Poems." In New Directions in Prose and Poetry, edited by James Laughlin. Vol. 14 (1953): 202–229; 
 Rudnitsky, Lexi. "Planes, Politics, and Protofeminist Poetics: Muriel Rukeyser's Theory of Flight and The Middle of the Air," Tulsa Studies in Women's Literature, v.27, n.2 (Fall 2008), pp. 237–257, DOI: 10.1353/tsw.0.0045
 "A Special Issue on Muriel Rukeyser." Poetry East 16/17 (Spring/Summer 1985); 
 Thurston, Michael, "Biographical sketch." Modern American Poetry, retrieved January 30, 2006
 Turner, Alberta. "Muriel Rukeyser." In Dictionary of Literary Biography 48, s.v. "American Poets, 1880–1945" (1986): 370–375; UJE; 
 "Under Forty." Contemporary Jewish Record 7 (February 1944): 4–9
 Ware, Michele S. "Opening 'The Gates': Muriel Rukeyser and the Poetry of Witness." Women's Studies: An Introductory Journal 22, no. 3 (1993): 297–308; WWWIA, 7.

External links 

Muriel Rukeyser: A Living Archive Ongoing project by Eastern Michigan University featuring creative content by Rukeyser as well as critical resources and creative responses by artists and scholars.
Muriel Rukeyser papers, 1844–1986 at the Library of Congress
Guide to the Muriel Rukeyser Papers at the Vassar College Archives and Special Collections Library
Muriel Rukeyser by Michael Thurston, Modern American Poetry, retrieved January 30, 2006
"The Book of the Dead" by Muriel Rukeyser
Muriel Rukeyser's FBI files
PennSound page (audio recordings).

1913 births
1980 deaths
American feminists
American tax resisters
American women poets
Bisexual women
Bisexual poets
Columbia University alumni
Ethical Culture Fieldston School alumni
Jewish American poets
Jewish feminists
Jewish women writers
LGBT Jews
American LGBT poets
Sarah Lawrence College faculty
Vassar College alumni
Yale Younger Poets winners
20th-century American poets
20th-century American women writers
LGBT people from New York (state)
Bisexual academics
Members of the American Academy of Arts and Letters
American bisexual writers